Thodoros Papayiannis is a Greek sculptor.

His sculptures are displayed in Greek Cyprus and he was assigned with several other sculptors to create public artwork for the Cypriot community, most notably in Limassol.

External links
https://web.archive.org/web/20070929083744/http://www.artower.gr/depot/papayiannis-depot.html 

Greek sculptors
Living people
Year of birth missing (living people)
Place of birth missing (living people)
Greek male artists